The discography of American rapper Tyga consists of seven studio albums, three compilation albums, twenty mixtapes, sixty-seven singles (including thirty-four as a featured artist) and forty-six music videos. In 2008, Tyga released his first studio album, No Introduction, on the record label Decaydance Records. The album included the single "Coconut Juice" (featuring Travie McCoy), the song peaked at number 94 on the US Billboard Hot 100, becoming Tyga's first song to appear on the chart. In 2010, Tyga and Virginia singer Chris Brown released the collaborative mixtape Fan of a Fan (2010), which included their hit single "Deuces": the song peaked at number 14 on the Billboard Hot 100 and became Tyga's first song to chart on the US Hot R&B/Hip-Hop Songs chart, peaking at number one.

The release of Tyga's second studio album (and his first to be released on the record label Young Money Entertainment), Careless World: Rise of the Last King (2012), was preceded by the release of the singles "Far Away", "Still Got It", "Rack City" and "Faded", with all four appearing on the Billboard Hot 100. "Rack City" was the most commercially successful single from the album, become Tyga's first single to reach the top 10 of the Billboard Hot 100, and also charting in Australia, Canada and the United Kingdom. Following several delays to its release date, Careless World: Rise of the Last King debuted at number 4 on the US Billboard 200 and at number one on both the US Top R&B/Hip-Hop Albums and Top Rap Albums charts. His third studio album, Hotel California, was released on April 9, 2013.

As of February 2017, Tyga has sold 600,000 albums and 12.2 million digital singles as a solo artist. His 2018 song "Taste" later became the best selling single of his career.

Albums

Studio albums

Collaboration albums

Compilation albums

Mixtapes

Singles

As lead artist

As featured artist

Promotional singles

Other charted and certified songs

Guest appearances

Music videos

Notes

References

External links
 Tyga discography
 Official website

Discographies of American artists
Hip hop discographies